Social Dancing is the second studio album by the Scottish musical trio Bis.

Critical reception
The Austin Chronicle thought that "while Social Dancing is enjoyable as a hyperactive whirl through Brit-pop forms of the Eighties and early Nineties, this homage to the material world lacks the rebel edge of the band's earlier work." Rolling Stone noted that "this time the guitars are tuned, the drum-machine beats are smoother, and the pep-rally yelps are more determinedly melodic."

AllMusic wrote that Bis "tried a whole bunch of different stuff, from more punky rave-ups to slinky trip-hop, and if the end result is a little scattered, it's also an enjoyable mess."

Track listing
All songs written by Bis unless otherwise indicated.

 "Making People Normal" – 2:28
 "I'm a Slut" – 2:44
 "Eurodisco" – 4:41
 "Action and Drama" – 2:29
 "Theme from Tokyo" (Bis, Virgin Stigma) – 2:40
 "The Hit Girl" – 3:01
 "Am I Loud Enough?" – 3:12
 "Shopaholic" – 2:41
 "Young Alien Types" – 3:11
 "Detour" (Bis, Lois Maffeo) – 4:58
 "Sale or Return" (Bis, John Cacavas) – 2:58
 "It's All New" – 3:21
 "Listen Up" – 2:20

 This is the UK/US CD release and matches the UK/US 12-inch release.
 The Japanese release adds the songs "Germfree Adolescents" (originally by X-Ray Spex) and "Famous (Andy Gill Version)" to the end.
 "Action and Drama" contains a sample of "New Breed" by the Mackenzies.
 "Theme from Tokyo" contains a sample of "Groupie Girl" by Virgin Stigma.
 "Sale or Return" contains a sample of "Agent Who" by John Cacavas.

Personnel
Bis
John Disco
Manda Rin
Sci-Fi Steven

Additional musicians
Lois Maffeo – vocals on "Detour"
Vincent Flaming – violin on "Theme from Tokyo"
Alan Mason – violin on "Theme from Tokyo"
Helen Mosherry – cello on "Theme from Tokyo"
Martin Wiggins – viola on "Theme from Tokyo"
Andy Gill – occasional guitar and keyboards
Rik Flick – occasional guitar and keyboards
Richie Dempsey – drum kit sample

Technical
Andy Gill – producer
Rik Flick – engineer
Jason Famous – additional engineering
Bob Kraushaar – mixing
Joe Dilworth – photography
Manda Rin – artwork
Alison Fielding – artwork

Charts

References

1999 albums
Bis (Scottish band) albums
Albums produced by Andy Gill